is a train station on the Minobu Line of Central Japan Railway Company (JR Central) located in the town of Ichikawamisato, Nishiyatsushiro District, Yamanashi Prefecture, Japan.

Lines
Ichikawa-Daimon Station is served by the Minobu Line and is located 69.8 kilometers from the southern terminus of the line at Fuji Station.

Layout
Ichikawa-Daimon Station has one island platform connected to the station building by a level crossing. The station is staffed.

Platforms

Adjacent stations

History
Ichikawa-Daimon Station was opened on December 17, 1927 as a station on the Fuji-Minobu Line. It was renamed to its current name on October 1, 1938. The line came under control of the Japanese Government Railways on May 1, 1941. Scheduled freight operations were discontinued in 1972. The JGR became the JNR (Japan National Railway) after World War II. The station has been unattended since April 1985. Along with the division and privatization of JNR on April 1, 1987, the station came under the control and operation of the Central Japan Railway Company. The station building was reconstructed in a traditional Chinese style in October 1995.

Surrounding area
 Fuefuki River

See also
 List of railway stations in Japan

External links

  Minobu Line station information  	

Railway stations in Japan opened in 1927
Railway stations in Yamanashi Prefecture
Minobu Line
Ichikawamisato, Yamanashi